Marcus H. MacWillie was a politician who represented the Confederate Arizona Territory in the Congress of the Confederate States during the American Civil War.

M. H. MacWillie was born circa 1836 in Inverness. Scotland. Little is known of his early life. One newspaper account has him a relative of Mississippi Governor William McWillie (1795–1869), but this seems unlikely. MacWillie passed his bar exam and established a legal practice in Texas. He later moved to Mesilla in what is now New Mexico and resumed his legal career. In early 1861 served as district judge, then chief justice, in Dr. Lewis S. Owings short-lived provisional government of the Arizona Territory (which included modern day New Mexico and Arizona).

Following the outbreak of the Civil War, Confederate army colonel John R. Baylor successfully invaded southern New Mexico and became the new Territorial governor. MacWillie became the Attorney General of the Confederate-claimed Arizona Territory in the newly designated capital of La Mesilla. Through the shrewd political efforts of his powerful friend John R. Baylor, MacWillie was selected December 30, 1861  to replace Baylor's rival Granville Henderson Oury as the territory's representative to the permanent Congress. Despite Arizona and New Mexico being taken over by the Union Army later in 1862, MacWillie continued to represent the territory throughout the First Confederate Congress (March 11, 1862 – February 17, 1864). He then served in the Second Confederate Congress until the end of the war.

MacWillie's activities following the war are uncertain. What we do know is that he lived in Chihuahua, Mexico, as an attorney, often handling mining claims. He was also involved in various southern Texas–northern Mexico railroad promotions, often visiting Texas, New Mexico, New Orleans and New York City. He died in Santa Barbara, California, March 5, 1875, during a trip to line up investors for a silver mine.

References
 Beers, Henry Putney, The Confederacy: A Guide to the Archives of the Government of the Confederate States of America. Washington, D.C.: United States National Archives and Records Administration, 1986.
 Current, Richard N., Encyclopedia of the Confederacy. New York: Simon & Schuster, 1993. .
 Journal of the Congress of the Confederate States of America, 1861–1865. Washington, D.C.: United States War Department, Government Printing Office, 1905.
 History of New Mexico. Volume II, Los Angeles, Chicago, New York: Pacific States Publishing Co., 1907.

Notes

Arizona lawyers
Confederate expatriates
Members of the Confederate States House of Representatives
People from Doña Ana County, New Mexico
People of Arizona in the American Civil War
People of New Mexico in the American Civil War
Texas lawyers
Year of birth unknown